Blake Preston Harnage (born November 26, 1988) is an American songwriter, music producer, multi-instrumentalist and composer. He has written, produced, engineered, mixed or performed on songs for Versa, PVRIS, Hands Like Houses, All Time Low, With Beating Hearts, and others.

Life and career
Harnage was born in Stuart, Florida. Immersed in music throughout his childhood, he has grown up under the influence of many musical styles. Starting guitar at a young age, Harnage has also received classical voice training. At age 14, Blake's first group performed locally, highlighting his blues guitar improvisation. Throughout high school, he played with various post-hardcore bands before starting VersaEmerge in 2006.

Versa and VersaEmerge

In 2007, Harnage founded the experimental rock band VersaEmerge with singer Sierra Kay in Port St. Lucie, Florida. Harnage and Kusterbeck began creating music under the simplified name Versa in 2013. Departing from the band's previously energetic rock sound, Versa showcases deep electronic and atmospheric sounds.

Producing
Blake Harnage has done production on many releases including VersaEmerge's 2012 release Another Atmosphere Preview EP, as well as the more recent release from Versa - Neon EP. In 2013, Harnage began work on debut album from PVRIS entitled White Noise. He and PVRIS vocalist Lynn Gunn completed the writing and recording of White Noise at his home studio in Port Saint Lucie, Florida, and at a former church-turned recording studio in Utica, New York. Harnage contributed to Hands Like Houses' 2016 album Dissonants as a writer and engineer. In 2017 Harnage produced PVRIS' sophomore album All We Know of Heaven, All We Need of Hell.

Harnage has also worked with artists such as All Time Low and Minke.

Composing
In 2014, Harnage composed a piece for the independent documentary film Of Many, produced by Chelsea Clinton. Premiering at the 2014 TriBeCa Film Festival, the film examined struggles between the Jewish and Muslim communities. In addition to TriBeCa, the film was also screened at the 2014 AFI DOCS Film Festival, a special event at the United Nations and more.

Discography

Singles

Non-singles

Albums

Versa

Studio albums with Versa 
Fixed at Zero (2010)

EPs with Versa

References

1988 births
Living people
Versa (band) members
Guitarists from Florida
American rock guitarists
American male guitarists
Lead guitarists